Black Lake is a lake in Berrien County, in the U.S. state of Michigan.

Black Lake was so named on account of the dark character of its water.

References

Lakes of Berrien County, Michigan